Sarah Laura Tucker (born 1995) is a Sierra Leonean model and beauty pageant titleholder who was crowned as the winner of the 2018 edition of the Miss Sierra Leone pageant.

Early life and education
Born in Bonthe District, Sierra Leone, Tucker studied mass communication at Fourah Bay College, University of Sierra Leone.

Pageantry

Miss Sierra Leone 2019
Whilst representing Bonthe District, Tucker was crowned winner of the 2018 edition of Miss Sierra Leone that was held on 25 August at the Bintumani Conference Centre in Freetown. This result qualified her to represent her country at the Miss World 2018 pageant held on 8 December at the Sanya City Arena in Sanya, China.

Miss World 2019
She represented Sierra Leone at the Miss World 2018 pageant but failed to place.

References

External links
Sarah Tucker on Miss Sierra Leone 2018
 Miss World Official Profile

1995 births
Living people
Miss World 2018 delegates
Sierra Leonean beauty pageant winners
People from Bonthe District